The gluteus maximus is the main extensor muscle of the hip in humans. It is the largest and outermost of the three gluteal muscles and makes up a large part of the shape and appearance of each side of the hips. It is the single largest muscle in the human body. Its thick fleshy mass, in a quadrilateral shape, forms the prominence of the buttocks. The other gluteal muscles are the medius and minimus, and sometimes informally these are collectively referred to as the glutes.

Its large size is one of the most characteristic features of the muscular system in humans, connected as it is with the power of maintaining the trunk in the erect posture. Other primates have much flatter hips and cannot sustain standing erectly.

The muscle is made up of muscle fascicles lying parallel with one another, and are collected together into larger bundles separated by fibrous septa.

Structure

The gluteus maximus (or buttock) is the outermost muscle of the buttocks. It arises from connections to nearby structures in this area. It arises from the posterior gluteal line of the inner upper ilium, a bone of the pelvis, as well as above it to the iliac crest and slightly below it; from the lower part of the sacrum and the side of the coccyx, the tailbone; from the aponeurosis of the erector spinae (lumbodorsal fascia), the sacrotuberous ligament, and the fascia covering the gluteus medius (gluteal aponeurosis).

The fibers are directed obliquely inferiorly and laterally;

The gluteus maximus ends in two main areas:
those forming the upper and larger portion of the muscle, together with the superficial fibers of the lower portion, end in a thick tendinous lamina, which passes across the greater trochanter, and inserts into the iliotibial band of the fascia lata;
the deeper fibers of the lower portion are inserted into the gluteal tuberosity of the linea aspera, between the vastus lateralis and adductor magnus. If present, the third trochanter also serves as an attachment.

Bursae
Three bursae are usually found in relation with the deep surface of this muscle:
One of these, of large size, separates it from the greater trochanter;
a second (often missing) is situated on the tuberosity of the ischium;
a third is found between the tendon of the muscle and that of the vastus lateralis.

Function
The gluteus maximus straightens the leg at the hip; when the leg is flexed at the hip, the gluteus maximus extends it to bring the leg into a straight line with the body. The anus also aligns when the leg is flexed at the hip, making the muscle tighten and the pelvis tilt forward.

Taking its fixed point from below, it acts upon the pelvis, supporting it and the trunk upon the head of the femur; this is particularly obvious in standing on one leg. Its most powerful action is to cause the body to regain the erect position after stooping, by drawing the pelvis backward, being assisted in this action by the biceps femoris (long head), semitendinosus, semimembranosus, and adductor magnus.

The gluteus maximus is a tensor of the fascia lata, and by its connection with the iliotibial band steadies the femur on the articular surfaces of the tibia during standing, when the extensor muscles are relaxed.

The lower part of the muscle also acts as an adductor and external rotator of the limb. The upper fibers act as abductors of the hip joints.

Society and culture

Training

The gluteus maximus is involved in several sports, from running to weight-lifting. A number of exercises focus on the gluteus maximus and other muscles of the upper leg:
Hip thrusts
Glute bridge
Quadruped hip extensions
Kettlebell swings
Squats and variations like split squats, unilateral squats with the raised foot positioned either backwards or forwards (pistols), and wide-stance lunges
Deadlift (and variations)
Reverse hyperextension
Four-way hip extensions
Glute-ham raise

In art
In cultural terms, the glutes are often considered a symbol of health and strength, and aesthetically appealing. They frequently feature in artwork which seeks to emphasise and celebrate physicality, and the ability to move dynamically and powerfully. They are usually shown to be efficiently proportioned and prominent. 

Evidence of such depictions of the gluteal muscles extends from at least Ancient Greece to the modern day.

Clinical significance
Functional assessment can be useful in assessing injuries to the gluteus maximus and surrounding muscles. 

The 30-second chair-to-stand test measures a participant's ability to stand up from a seated position as many times as possible in a thirty-second period of time.  Testing the number of times a person can stand up in a thirty-second period helps assess strength, flexibility, pain, and endurance, which can help determine how far along a person is in rehabilitation, or how much work is still to be done.

The piriformis test measures flexibility of the gluteus maximus. This requires a trained professional and is based on the angle of external and internal rotation in relation to normal range of motion without injury or impingement.

Other animals
The gluteus maximus is larger in size and thicker in humans than in other primates. Its large size is one of the most characteristic features of the muscular system in humans, connected as it is with the power of maintaining the trunk in the erect posture. Other primates have much flatter hips and cannot sustain standing erectly.

In other primates, the correlate to the human gluteus maximus consists of the ischiofemoralis, a small muscle that corresponds to the human gluteus maximus and originates from the ilium and the sacroiliac ligament, and the gluteus maximus proprius, a large muscle that extends from the ischial tuberosity to a relatively more distant insertion on the femur. In adapting to bipedal gait, reorganization of the attachment of the muscle as well as the moment arm was required.

Additional images

See also

 Coccyx (tailbone)
 List of skeletal muscles of the human body

References

External links

 
 
 

Hip adductors
Hip extensors
Hip lateral rotators
Muscles of the gluteus
Hip muscles
Muscles of the lower limb